The Anderson Bank Building is a historic bank building located at Anderson, Indiana in the United States. It was built for the Anderson Banking Company in 1928. The bank building is located at 931 Meridan Street. The Anderson Banking Company began business on January 30, 1890. It was the only bank in Anderson to survive the Great Depression without closing. In 1985, the bank was acquired by Merchants National Corporation of Indianapolis. In 1991 Merchants National Corporation was acquired by National City Bank. National City Bank still operates a branch in the Anderson Bank Building.

The art deco details at the exterior street level and in the main banking lobby have been obliterated. The building's main architectural interest lies in the still existent art deco detailing in the building's elevator lobby and upper floors.

References

Sources
 Anderson: A Pictorial History by Esther Dittlinger, copyright 1991, pages 160,161.

Bank buildings on the National Register of Historic Places in Indiana
Commercial buildings completed in 1928
Art Deco architecture in Indiana
1928 establishments in Indiana
Buildings and structures in Anderson, Indiana
National Register of Historic Places in Madison County, Indiana